RNAS Culham (HMS Hornbill) was a Royal Naval Air Station (RNAS) near Culham, Oxfordshire.  It opened in 1944 as an Aircraft Receipt and Despatch Unit for the Royal Navy.

The ground layout was typical of many bomber stations, with three runways. However it had many hangars, mostly sited around the field's perimeter. Initially HMS Hornbill was used to train reservists based in the Thames Valley area using several different types of aircraft including Supermarine Seafires, Hawker Sea Furys and North American Harvards. In May 1947 the Photographic Trials and Development Unit was based at HMS Hornbill, and in 1951 1840 Naval Air Squadron operated from the airfield for a short time. Ab initio flight training of cadets from Britannia Royal Naval College, Dartmouth, flying primary gliders, was also undertaken here in the early 1950s.

The following units were here at some point:
 No. 1 Ferry Flight
 739 Naval Air Squadron
 812 Naval Air Squadron
 1830 Naval Air Squadron
 1832 Naval Air Squadron
 1832A Naval Air Squadron
 1832B Naval Air Squadron
 1835 Naval Air Squadron
 1836 Naval Air Squadron
 1840 Naval Air Squadron

The airfield closed on 30 September 1953 and the Admiralty subsequently used it as a storage facility. In 1960 the airfield was transferred to the United Kingdom Atomic Energy Authority for use in nuclear and atomic research. The Joint European Torus (JET) nuclear fusion project is now based at the site.

RAF Beccles was a temporary lodging area under Culham's administration, and as such was called HMS Hornbill II.

References

External links
 RN Culham Airfield
 WW2 Airfields - Culham

Culham
Organisations based in Oxfordshire